Bastuträsk is a village in Bjurholm Municipality, Västerbotten, Sweden, located around 50 kilometer northwest from Umeå. There is also a nearby lake, which has the same name, Bastuträsk.

Famous people 
 Tomas Pleje

External links 
 Homepage

Populated places in Västerbotten County